Lê Trung Tông may refer to :
  Lê Trung Tông (Early Lê dynasty) (r. 1005)
  Lê Trung Tông (Revival Lê dynasty) (r. 1548 - 1556)